UDB may refer to:


Computing
 Universal Database, the original name of the IBM Db2 database
 Universal Desktop Box, a line of desktop computers originally named DEC Multia
 User database, for T9 predictive text
 Universal Data Bank, the original name of UDB CORPORATION
 Ultimate Doom Builder, the level/script editor for the first-person shooter Doom and its derivatives.
 Undo debugger, a form of Time travel debugging

Politics
 Bolivian Democratic Union, a former right-wing political party in Bolivia
 Breton Democratic Union (Union Démocratique Bretonne), the main Breton autonomist political party
 Belgian Democratic Union (Union Démocratique Belge), a short-lived Belgian political party after the Second World War

Other uses
 Dakar Bourguiba University in Dakar, Senegal
 Universidad Don Bosco, a university in El Salvador
 Urbancorp Development Bank, a subsidiary of Urban Bank, Philippines

See also
 Uganda Development Bank Limited (UDBL), a development financial institution, owned by the Government of Uganda 
 Uprava državne bezbednosti (UDBA), the secret police organization of the Socialist Federal Republic of Yugoslavia